The Dalmatian pelican (Pelecanus crispus) is the largest member of the pelican family, and perhaps the world's largest freshwater bird, although rivaled in weight and length by the largest swans. They are elegant soaring birds, with wingspans rivaling those of the great albatrosses, and their flocks fly in graceful synchrony. With a range spanning across much of Central Eurasia, from the Mediterranean in the West to the Taiwan Strait in the East, and from the Persian Gulf in the South to Siberia in the North, it is a short-to-medium-distance migrant between breeding and overwintering areas. No subspecies are known to exist over its wide range, but based on size differences, a Pleistocene paleosubspecies, P. c. palaeocrispus, has been described from fossils recovered at Binagady, Azerbaijan.

As with other pelicans, the males are larger than the females, and likewise their diet is mainly fish. Their curly nape feathers, grey legs and silvery-white plumage are distinguishing features, and the wings appear solid grey in flight. The adults acquire a drabber plumage in winter, however, when they may be mistaken for great white pelicans. Their harsh vocalizations become more pronounced during the mating season. They breed across the Palearctic from southeastern Europe to Russia, India and China in swamps and shallow lakes. They usually return to traditional breeding sites, where they are less social than other pelican species. Their nests are crude heaps of vegetation, which are placed on islands or on dense mats of vegetation.

The species' numbers underwent a dramatic decline during the 20th century, partly due to land use, disturbance and poaching activities. The core population survives in Russia, but in its Mongolian range it is critically endangered. Removal of power lines to prevent collisions or electrocution and construction of nesting platforms or rafts have reversed declines locally.

Description

This huge bird is by a slight margin the largest of the pelican species and one of the largest living flying bird species. More recently, six male Dalmatians were found to average  and four females , around the same average weight as the great white pelican (Pelecanus onocrotalus) and slightly lighter than mean body masses from other huge birds such as the trumpeter swan (Cygnus buccinator) or Andean condor (Vultur gryphus). These same five species are probably rank as the largest flying birds in Asia as well, alongside the Himalayan vulture (Gyps himalayensis). It also appears to have one of the largest wingspans of any living bird, rivaling those of the great albatrosses (Diomedea ssp., in particular the two largest species, the wandering albatross and southern royal albatross) and the great white pelican.

The somewhat similar-looking great white pelican broadly overlaps in size but has greater size sexual dimorphism: female great whites can be noticeably smaller than female Dalmatians but male individuals of the two species are essentially the same size and weight. However, the Dalmatian differs from this other very large species in that it has curly nape feathers, grey legs and silvery-white (rather than pure white) plumage. In winter, adult Dalmatian pelicans go from silvery-grey to a dingier brownish-grey cream colour. Immature birds are grey and lack the pink facial patch of immature white pelicans. The loose feathers around the forehead of the Dalmatian pelican can form a W-like-shape on the face right above the bill. In the breeding season it has an orange-red lower mandible and pouch against a yellow upper mandible. In winter, the whole bill is a somewhat dull yellow. The bare skin around the eye can vary from yellow to purplish in colour. When the Dalmatian pelican is in flight, unlike other pelicans, its wings are solid grayish-white with black tips. It is an elegant soaring bird. When a whole flock of Dalmatian pelicans is in flight, all its members move in graceful synchrony, their necks held back like a heron's.

The Dalmatian pelican is often silent, as most pelicans tend to be, although it can be fairly vocal during the mating season, when it may engage in a wide range of guttural, deep vocalisations, including barks, hisses and grunts.

Distribution and habitat
The Dalmatian pelican is found in lakes, rivers, deltas and estuaries. Compared to the great white pelican, the Dalmatian is not as tied to lowland areas and will nest in suitable wetlands with many elevations. It is less opportunistic in breeding habitat selection than the great white, usually returning to a traditional breeding site year after year unless it becomes completely unsuitable. During the winter, Dalmatian pelicans usually stay on ice-free lakes in Europe or jheels (seasonal lakes) in India. They also visit, typically during winter, inshore areas along sheltered coasts for feeding.

Movements
This pelican usually migrates short distances with varying migration patterns during the year. It is dispersive in Europe, based on feeding opportunities, with most western birds staying through the winter in the Mediterranean region. In the Danube Delta, Dalmatian pelicans arrive in March and leave by the end of August. It is more actively migratory in Asia, where most of the birds that breed in Russia fly down for the winter to the central Middle East, largely around Iran through to the Indian Subcontinent, from Sri Lanka, Nepal to central India. The pelicans that breed in Mongolia winter along the east coast of China, including the Hong Kong area.

In general, the species prefers relatively warm temperatures. During periods where the climate was warmer, the Dalmatian pelican was far more widespread in Europe (today its European range is restricted to the southeastern part of the continent). Notably, a large number of subfossil bones dating from 7400–5000 Before Present (BP), coinciding with the Holocene climatic optimum, have been found in Denmark, and bones dating from 1900–600 BP have been found in central Europe, Netherlands and Britain. This preference for warmer temperatures is also supported by movements recorded in recent history, as there are indications of a slow range expansion in response to modern climate changes.

Behavior

Feeding
This pelican feeds almost entirely on fish. Preferred prey species can include common carp (Cyprinus carpio), European perch (Perca fluviatilis), common rudd (Scardinius erythropthalmus), eels, catfish (especially silurids during winter), mullet and northern pike (Esox lucius), the latter having measured up to  when taken. In the largest remnant colony, located in Greece, the preferred prey is reportedly the native Alburnus belvica. It usually forages alone or in groups of only two or three. It normally swims along, placidly and slowly, until it quickly dunks its head underwater and scoops the fish out, along with great masses of water. The water is dumped out of the sides of the pouch and the fish is swallowed. Occasionally it may feed cooperatively with other pelicans by corralling fish into shallow waters and may even cooperate similarly while fishing alongside great cormorants in Greece. Occasionally, the pelican may not immediately eat the fish contained in its gular pouch, so it can save the prey for later consumption. Other small wetlands-dwellers may supplement the diet, including crustaceans, worms, beetles and small water birds, usually nestlings and eggs.

Breeding

Among a highly social family in general, Dalmatian pelicans may have the least social inclinations. This species naturally nests in relatively small groups compared to most other pelican species and sometimes may even nest alone. However, small colonies are usually formed, which regularly include upwards of 250 pairs (especially historically). Occasionally, Dalmatian pelicans may mix in with colonies of great white pelicans. Nesting sites selected are usually either islands in large bodies of water (typically lagoons or river deltas) or dense mats of aquatic vegetation, such as extensive reedbeds of Phragmites and Typha. Due to their large size, these pelicans often trample the vegetation in the area surrounding their nests into the muddy substrate and thus nesting sites may become unsuitably muddy after around three years of usage.

Nests are usually located on or near the ground, often being placed on dense floating vegetation. Nests tend to be flimsy until cemented together by droppings. Breeding commences in March or April, about a month before the great white pelican breeds. The Dalmatian pelican lays a clutch of one to six eggs, with two eggs being the norm. Incubation, which is split between both parents, lasts for 30 to 34 days. The chicks are born naked but soon sprout white down feathers. Aggressive behaviors between siblings are very rare and generally non-fatal. When the young are 6 to 7 weeks of age, the pelicans frequently gather in "pods". The offspring fledge at around 85 days and become independent at 100 to 105 days old. Nesting success relies on local environmental conditions, with anywhere from 58% to 100% of hatchlings successfully surviving to adulthood. Sexual maturity is thought to be obtained at three or four years of age.

Predators
Predation on Dalmatian pelicans is relatively poorly known despite the species' threatened status. Adult birds have no natural enemies and the nesting sites often insure limited nest predation, though carnivorous mammals which eat eggs and nestlings can access nests when water levels are low enough for them to cross, as has been recorded with wild boars (Sus scrofa) destroying nests in Bulgaria. Golden jackals (Canis aureus) are also known to access and destroy nests when water levels are too low and the same is possibly true of other canids such as foxes, gray wolves (Canis lupus) and dogs (C. l. familiaris), not to mention other predatory animals such as potentially Eurasian lynxes (Lynx lynx). Some eagles may attack pelicans at colonies, although this is not verified. Large gulls are known to be virulent predators of Dalmatian pelican eggs in Russia, Albania and Turkey.

Status

This species of pelican has declined greatly throughout its range, more so than the white pelican. It is possible that up to 10,000–20,000 pelicans exist at the species level. During the 20th century, the species' numbers underwent a dramatic decline for reasons that are not entirely understood. The most likely reason was habitat loss due to human activities such as the drainage of wetlands and land development. Colonies are regularly disturbed by human activity, and, like all pelicans, the parents may temporarily leave their nest if threatened, which then exposes the chicks to the risk of predation. Occasionally, Dalmatian pelicans may be shot by fishermen who believe the birds are dangerously depleting the fish population and hence threatening their livelihood. While such killings are generally on a small scale, the worry that these pelicans over-exploit the fishing stock persists in many locales. Another probable reason for the decline in the species' population is poaching. In Mongolia, the local people clandestinely kill these pelicans to use or sell their bills as pouches. On a typical day in a commercial Mongolian marketplace, as many as fifty pelican bills may be on offer for sale, and they are considered such a rare prize that ten horses and thirty sheep are considered a fair price to trade for a single pelican. Due to exploitation at all stages of the life cycle, the species is critically endangered in its Mongolian range, with a total population of fewer than 130 individual birds. Dalmatian pelicans also regularly fly into power-lines and are killed by electrocution. In Greece, pelicans are often so disturbed by power boats, usually ones bearing tourists—that they become unable to feed and die of malnourishment. In 1994 in Europe there were over a thousand breeding pairs, most of them in Greece, but also in Ukraine, Macedonia, Romania, Bulgaria (Srebarna Nature Reserve) and Albania (Karavasta Lagoon). They have been considered extinct in Croatia since the 1950s, although a single Dalmatian pelican was observed there in 2011. The largest single remaining colony is at Small Prespa Lake (shared between Albania and Greece), with around 1,600 pairs, with approximately 450 pairs left in the Danube Delta. The country with the largest breeding population today, including about 70% of pairs or possibly over 3,000 pairs, is Russia. Worldwide, there are an estimated 3,000–5,000 breeding pairs. One report of approximately 8,000 Dalmatian pelicans in India turned out to be a congregation of misidentified great white pelicans.

The Dalmatian pelican is one of the species to which the Agreement on the Conservation of African-Eurasian Migratory Waterbirds (AEWA) applies. Conservation efforts have been undertaken on behalf of the species, especially in Europe. Although they normally nest on the ground, Dalmatian pelicans have nested on platforms put out in Turkey, Greece, Bulgaria and Romania in order to encourage them to breed. Rafts over water have also been set up for the species to use in Greece and Bulgaria. Power-lines have also been marked or dismantled in areas adjacent to colonies in these countries. Additionally, water-level management and educational programs may be aiding them at a local level. Although efforts have been undertaken in Asia, there is a much higher rate of poaching, shooting and habitat destruction there, which may make conservation efforts more difficult. In 2012, when unusually frigid winter conditions caused the Caspian Sea to freeze over, it resulted in the death from starvation of at least twenty of the Dalmatian pelicans that overwinter there. Despite local authorities' initial attempts to discourage it, many people there turned out with fish and hand-fed the birds, apparently enabling the huge pelicans to survive the winter.

References

External links

BirdLife Species Factsheet.
European Commission for Environment: Action plan for the Dalmatian Pelican (1996)
Dalmatian pelican photo gallery by Jari Peltomäki
Conference Proceedings of the 2009 Adriatic Flyway Conference in Ulcinj, Montenegro

Dalmatian pelican
Dalmatian pelican
Birds of Azerbaijan
Birds of Central Asia
Birds of Western Asia
Dalmatian pelican
Dalmatian pelican